Mavillapadu is a village in Varadaiahpalem mandal in Tirupati district in the state of Andhra Pradesh in  India.

References

Villages in Tirupati district